The 1951 New Zealand general election was a nationwide vote to determine the shape of the New Zealand Parliament's 30th term. The First National Government was re-elected, with the National Party increasing its parliamentary majority over the opposition Labour Party. This was the last time until the  that a party was elected to majority government of New Zealand by receiving a majority of the vote.

Background
The National Party had formed its first administration after the 1949 elections, in which it had ended four terms of government by the Labour Party. The National government, with Sidney Holland as Prime Minister, had undertaken a number of economic and constitutional reforms, although it had not seriously modified the new social welfare system which Labour had introduced. Labour's leader, Peter Fraser, had died in December 1950 after a long period of poor health, and had been replaced in January 1951 by Walter Nash. Nash had been Minister of Finance for the duration of the first Labour government.

The most significant issue in the 1951 elections was the growing industrial unrest of the time, particularly the ongoing dockworkers dispute. Holland condemned the strikers, calling the situation "industrial anarchy". The Labour Party, under Nash, attempted to take a moderate position in the dispute, but ended up displeasing both sides. Holland, seeking a mandate to respond strongly to the strike, called a snap election. Another issue was high inflation, which frustrated voters and without the distraction of the strike, might have threatened Holland's government at the scheduled election for 1952.

MPs retiring in 1951
Two MPs retired at the election, one each from Labour and National.

The election
The date for the main 1951 elections was 1 September, and for the first time, elections to the four Maori seats were held on the same day. The 1951 elections were also the first under the new regulations which required elections to be held on a Saturday. 1,205,762 people were registered to vote, and turnout was 89.1%. The number of seats being contested was 80, a number which had been fixed since 1902.

Results

Party standings
The 1951 election saw the governing National Party re-elected with a twenty-seat margin, a substantial improvement on the twelve-seat margin it previously held. National won fifty seats compared with the Labour Party's thirty. The popular vote was closer, however, with National winning 54% to Labour's 46%. No seats were won by minor party candidates or by independents. No party then captured a majority of the vote until the 2020 election, when Labour won 50.01%.

Votes summary

Key

|-
 |colspan=8 style="background-color:#FFDEAD" | General electorates
|-

|-
 | Hauraki
 | style="background-color:;" |
 | colspan=3 style="text-align:center;background-color:;" | Andy Sutherland
 | style="text-align:right;" | 4,468
 | style="background-color:;" |
 | style="text-align:center;" | Brevat William Dynes
|-

|-
 |colspan=8 style="background-color:#FFDEAD" | Māori electorates
|-

|}

Table footnotes:

Notes

References